Sigrid Goral (born 15 January 1952) is a retired East German swimmer. In 1968 she won the national championships in the 800 m freestyle and set a European record at 9'43.5. However, later at the 1968 Summer Olympics she swam a mere 10'09.3 and failed to reach the final.

References

1952 births
Living people
East German female swimmers
Olympic swimmers of East Germany
Swimmers at the 1968 Summer Olympics
East German female freestyle swimmers
Sportspeople from Brandenburg an der Havel